The RD-250 (GRAU Index 8D518) is the base version of a dual-nozzle family of liquid rocket engines, burning N2O4 and UDMH in the gas-generator open cycle. The RD-250 was developed by OKB-456 for Yangel's PA Yuzhmash ICBM, the R-36 (8K67). Its variations were also used on the Tsyklon-2 and Tsyklon-3 launch vehicles. It was supposed to be used on the Tsyklon-4, but since the cancellation of the project it should be considered as out of production.

Versions
The engine has seen different versions made:
 RD-250 (GRAU Index 8D518): Base engine of the family. Used on the R-36. A bundle of three RD-250 form the RD-251 cluster.
 RD-250P (GRAU Index 8D518P): Improved version of the RD-250. Used on the R-36P. A bundle of three RD-250P form the RD-251P cluster.
 RD-250M (GRAU Index 8D518M): Improved version of the RD-250P. Used on the R-36-O. A bundle of three RD-250M form the RD-251M cluster.
 RD-250PM (GRAU Index 8D518PM): Improved version of the RD-250M. Used on the Tsyklon-3. A bundle of three RD-250PM form the RD-261 cluster.
 RD-252 (GRAU Index 8D724): Vacuum optimized version of the RD-250. Used on the R-36 and Tsyklon-2 second stages.
 RD-262 (GRAU Index 11D26): Improved version of the RD-252. Used on the Tsyklon-3 second stages.

Modules 
Some of these engines were bundled into modules of multiple engines. The relevant modules and auxiliary engines are:
 RD-251 (GRAU Index 8D723): A module comprising three RD-250. Propulsion module of the R-36 (8K67) first stage.
 RD-251P (GRAU Index 8D723P): A module comprising three RD-250P. Propulsion module of the R-36P (8K68) first stage.
 RD-251M (GRAU Index 8D723M): A module comprising three RD-250M. Propulsion module of the R-36-O (8K69) and Tsyklon-2 first stage.
 RD-261 (GRAU Index 11D69): A module comprising three RD-250PM. Propulsion module of the Tsyklon-3 first stage.

Comparison

Possible technological transfer to North Korea 
Several experts think that technology from the RD-250 engine could have been transferred to North Korea from Ukraine. This transfer would explain the rapid progress of North Korea in the development of two new missiles: the intermediate-range Hwasong-12 and the intercontinental ballistic missile (ICBM), Hwasong-14. Due to complexity of the technology involved in this type of engine, modifications or reverse engineering seem difficult to achieve. Thus it is believable that complete hardware could have been bought on black market and directly shipped to North Korea, by Russia or Ukraine. Conversely, there is analysis suggesting an alternative mechanism for North Korea to receive R-36 missile engines, or an entire missile, from USSR or Russia.

See also

R-36 (missile) - ICBM for which this engine was originally developed.
Tsyklon-2 - launch vehicle based on the R-36.
Tsyklon-3 - Three stage launch vehicle developed from the Tsyklon-2.
Cyclone-4M - launch vehicle based on the R-36
Rocket engine using liquid fuel

References

External links 
 Yuzhmash official information on the RD-261.
 Encyclopedia Astronautica information on RD-250 base engine.

Rocket engines of the Soviet Union
Rocket engines using hypergolic propellant
Rocket engines using the staged combustion cycle
Energomash rocket engines
Yuzhmash rocket engines